Ejogo is a surname. Notable people with the surname include:

 Carmen Ejogo (born 1974), British actress and singer
 Charles Ejogo (born 1976), British entrepreneur